Anandamoy Bhattacharjee (20 December 1933 – 16 January 2008) was a Bengali Indian jurist, who served as the chief justice of the Calcutta High Court and the Bombay High Court between 1993 and 1995. He had also served as an acting chief justice of the Sikkim High Court.

Early life
He was born on 20 December 1933 and was educated at the Siliguri Boys High School in Siliguri, the St. Paul's Cathedral Mission College, the Scottish Church College both in Kolkata and at Department of Law, University of Calcutta.

Career
He enrolled as an advocate of the Calcutta High Court in January 1957. He practiced civil and criminal in the district courts of Darjeeling and Jalpaiguri (in West Bengal) and at Gangtok (in Sikkim). He had also worked as legal adviser to the Government of Sikkim from May 1972.

He was appointed a judge in the Sikkim High Court in June 1976, and was appointed acting chief justice there in January 1985. He was transferred as judge to the Calcutta High Court in February 1986, and was the acting chief justice there from June 1992. He was made the chief justice of the Calcutta High Court in January 1993, and was subsequently transferred as the chief justice of the Bombay High Court in April, 1994 where he stayed in office till April 1995.

He had after his retirement, served as a visiting faculty at the Rajiv Gandhi School of Intellectual Property Law of the Indian Institute of Technology Kharagpur.

References

1933 births
20th-century Indian judges
Judges of the Sikkim High Court
Judges of the Calcutta High Court
Chief Justices of the Calcutta High Court
St. Paul's Cathedral Mission College alumni
Scottish Church College alumni
University of Calcutta alumni
Academic staff of IIT Kharagpur
2008 deaths
People from Siliguri
Chief Justices of the Bombay High Court